Chemically strengthened glass is a type of glass that has increased strength as a result of a post-production chemical process. When broken, it still shatters in long pointed splinters similar to float glass. For this reason, it is not considered a safety glass and must be laminated if a safety glass is required. However, chemically strengthened glass is typically six to eight times the strength of float glass. The most common trademark for this kind of glass is Gorilla glass.

The glass is chemically strengthened by a surface finishing process. This causes sodium ions in the glass surface to be replaced by potassium ions from the bath.

These potassium ions are larger than the sodium ions and therefore wedge into the gaps left by the smaller sodium ions when they migrate to the molten potassium nitrate. This replacement of ions causes the surface of the glass to be in a state of compression and the core in compensating tension.

The strengthening mechanism depends on the fact that the compressive strength of glass is significantly higher than its tensile strength. With both surfaces of the glass already in compression, it takes a certain amount of bending before one of the surfaces can even go into tension. More bending is required to reach the tensile strength. The other surface simply experiences more and more compressive stress. But since the compressive strength is so much larger, no compressive failure is experienced.

Because the surface of chemically strengthened glass is in compression, it is also significantly more scratch resistant than untreated glass. This is why cell phone screens are typically made this way. Since phones are commonly carried in a pocket or purse with other items such as keys, scratch resistance is important.

There also exists a more advanced two-stage process for making chemically strengthened glass, in which the glass article is first immersed in a sodium nitrate bath at 450 °C (842 °F), which enriches the surface with sodium ions. This leaves more sodium ions on the glass for the immersion in potassium nitrate to replace with potassium ions. In this way, the use of a sodium nitrate bath increases the potential for surface compression in the finished article.

Chemical strengthening results in a strengthening similar to toughened glass. However, the process does not use extreme variations of temperature and therefore chemically strengthened glass has little or no bow or warp, optical distortion or strain pattern. This differs from toughened glass, in which slender pieces can be significantly bowed.

Also unlike toughened glass, chemically strengthened glass may be cut after strengthening, but loses its added strength within the region of approximately 20 mm of the cut. Similarly, when the surface of chemically strengthened glass is deeply scratched, this area loses its additional strength.

Another negative of chemically strengthened glass is the added cost. While tempered glass can be made cheaply through the fabrication process, chemically strengthened glass has a much more expensive route to the market. These costs make the product prohibitive for use in many applications.

Chemically strengthened glass was used for the aircraft canopy of some fighter aircraft.

See also
 Architectural glass
 Toughened glass

References

Glass types
Glass coating and surface modification